Dennis Leech (born 6 April 1943 in Sidmouth) is a British retired auto racing driver. Most of his racing career was spent driving saloon cars, mainly as a privateer in the British Touring Car Championship. He also entered selected rounds of the British Formula One Championship. His most competitive years in the BTCC came in the 1980s, where he was often a front runner in his Class A 3.5 litre Rover Vitesse. In 1987 he finished as runner-up in his class, finishing sixth overall in his ageing Rover. His final year in the BTCC came in 1992, entering his own-built Ford Sierra.

Racing record

Complete British Saloon / Touring Car Championship results
(key) (Races in bold indicate pole position; races in italics indicate fastest lap.)

† Events with 2 races staged for the different classes.

Complete European F5000 Championship results
(key) (Races in bold indicate pole position; races in italics indicate fastest lap.)

Complete Shellsport International Series results
(key) (Races in bold indicate pole position; races in italics indicate fastest lap.)

Complete British Formula One Championship results
(key) (Races in bold indicate pole position; races in italics indicate fastest lap.)

References

1943 births
British Touring Car Championship drivers
British Formula One Championship drivers
English racing drivers
English Formula One drivers
Living people
People from Sidmouth
Britcar 24-hour drivers